U.S. Route 49 (US 49) is a north–south United States highway. The highway's northern terminus is in Piggott, Arkansas, at an intersection with US Route 62/Highway 1/Highway 139 (US 62/AR 1/AR 139).  Its southern terminus is in Gulfport, Mississippi, at an intersection with U.S. Route 90. US 49 is approximately 516 miles (830 km) in length.

It was at the junction of US 49 and U.S. Route 61 that blues singer Robert Johnson is said to have sold his soul to the Devil.  The highway is also the subject of songs by  Big Joe Williams and Howlin' Wolf (Chester Arthur Burnett).

Route description

Mississippi

|-
|MS
|334
|538
|-
|AR
|182
|293
|-
|Total
|516
|830
|}
US 49 has historically been one of the most important highways in Mississippi. It was the state's first highway to see a significant rural segment four-laned. Today, it is the only four-laned route directly connecting Jackson, the state's capital and largest city, to the Mississippi Gulf Coast. Some urban segments along this portion of the route maintain three or more traffic lanes in each direction. US 49 serves as a primary hurricane evacuation route for Gulf Coast residents.

US 49 begins near the Port of Gulfport, Mississippi at a junction with US 90. It provides a major connection between the port, casinos, beaches and downtown with I-10 (exits 34A-B), where it has its first major junction being a full service cloverleaf interchange on the city's north end. The crossing of these two roads is officially recognized by the state of Mississippi as the Castilgia Interchange. North of I-10, US 49 passes through suburban areas and enters De Soto National Forest. Various state highway interchanges and junctions are encountered before the route passes near Camp Shelby, then through an interchange with US 98 just south of Hattiesburg. At this point, travelers have an option of continuing on US 49 through Hattiesburg or using the I-59/US 98 bypass which reconnects with US 49 in the northern part of the city. Continuing on US 49 brings one to a cloverleaf interchange at US 11, one of very few in the South to lack merging lanes between loop ramps, thus altering the usual weaving patterns which plague many of these interchanges.

US 49 passes Hattiesburg's primary medical facility, Forrest General Hospital, and the campus of the University of Southern Mississippi before arriving at another, more standard cloverleaf interchange with I-59. Those who used the aforementioned bypass, wishing to reconnect with US 49 North to the state capital, must use exit 67B. It is also at I-59, where Mississippi Highway 42 (MS 42) runs with US 49 for a short distance as suburban development is soon encountered as the road returns to rural environs. Eventually, MS 42 departs from the four-laned highway and branches off to the west toward smaller towns, starting with Sumrall. Interchanges between Hattiesburg and Jackson provide access to various state highways, and one at Collins provides access to US 84.

At Jackson, US 49 upgrades to Interstate Highway standards before joining I-20 using a two-lane flyover. About a mile later, I-20/US 49 merges with I-55 at a stack interchange. I-20/I-55/US 49 crosses the Pearl River into Hinds County and bypasses Downtown Jackson, where I-55 departs to the south. US 49/I-20 continue west until US 49 ends its run with I-20 and joins I-220 before turning northwest to Yazoo City. A split in the highway, rare in the U.S. Highway System, begins here; both routes head into the Mississippi Delta, US 49W serving the towns of Belzoni and Indianola, where it junctions with US 82 and its four-lane segment ends, while two-laned US 49E serves Tchula before encountering US 82 at Greenwood. Both routes continue north from US 82 and are linked again at Tutwiler. Continuing northwest, the highway passes through an interchange with US 61 as it enters Clarksdale. It is at Clarksdale that US 49 encounters "The Crossroads", the legendary junction with State Street (an old alignment of US 61) where the great blues musician Robert Johnson is reputed to have sold his soul to the devil.

From Clarksdale, US 49 continues north and crosses the Mississippi River using the Helena Bridge where it enters Arkansas near the town of Helena.

In May 2005 portions of extant US 49E were renamed the "Emmett Till Memorial Highway".

The Mississippi section of US 49 and the routes of US 49E and US 49W are defined at Mississippi Code Annotated § 65-3-3.

Arkansas
US 49 enters Arkansas near Helena-West Helena in Phillips County. US 49 Business runs around the north part of the city, with the main route meeting AR 242 in the southern portion. US 49 continues west to Walnut Corner where the route meets AR 1 (and briefly AR 316). The US 49/AR 1 concurrency ends in Marvell and US 49 enters Monroe County.

Upon entering Monroe County, US 49 turns north to begin a concurrency with AR 39. US 49 also crosses US 79 before meeting US 70 near Brinkley. The route crosses Interstate 40 north of Brinkley prior to entering Woodruff County. US 49 runs northeast through rural Woodruff County, not crossing of concurring with any important routes before crossing into Cross County.

The route meets US 64 in Fair Oaks and meets AR 42 in southern Hickory Ridge. It then enters Poinsett County, concurring with AR 214 from Fisher until Waldenburg. The route  crosses AR 14 in Waldenburg.

US 49 runs along south Jonesboro, with US 49 Business formerly running into town. US 49 concurs with US 63 until again joining AR 1. The two routes angle north through downtown Jonesboro, crossing US 63 Business and passing by ASU Stadium before leaving town. US 49/AR 1 pass around Brookland, with US 49 Business serving the community.

Entering Greene County, US 49/AR 1 intersects US 412 and briefly meets AR 358 before entering Paragould. The routes cross US 412B near Kirk Field in Paragould, also meeting AR 135 north of town. US 49B also rejoins US 49/AR 1 north of Paragould.

Continuing northeast through rural Greene County, US 49/AR 1 meet AR 34 in Marmaduke and AR 90 in Rector. The route turns north to Piggott at Hargrave Corner, terminating at US 62/AR 139. The Arkansas portion of US 49 is mainly two-lane undivided.

History
One of the original US highways, US 49 was extended north from Clarksdale, Mississippi to US 70 in Brinkley, Arkansas via U.S. Route 61 and Highway 6 in 1963. US 49 was again extended north in 1978, replacing Highway 39 between Brinkley and Jonesboro. Highway 1 between Jonesboro and Piggott was redesignated as US 49 in 1979.

It is notable that for several years during the 1930s, a second split route existed on US 49 in South Mississippi, similar to but shorter than the split that still exists in the Delta region. Between Brooklyn and Hattiesburg, travelers had the option of a  direct route via US 49W, or a somewhat shorter but broken route on US 49E, serving the Forrest County Agricultural High School and the small community of McLaurin, Mississippi.

Gallery

Major intersections

U.S. Route 49E

U.S. Route 49E (US 49E) is an  U.S. Highway in the Delta region of Mississippi. It travels through Yazoo, Holmes, Leflore, and Tallahatchie counties.

U.S. Route 49W

U.S. Route 49W (US 49W) is an  U.S. Highway in the Delta Region of Mississippi, passing through Yazoo, Humphreys, Sunflower, and Tallahatchie counties.

See also

Related Routes
 Arkansas Highway 349
 Mississippi Highway 149

Special routes

U.S. Route 49 Business in Brookland, Arkansas
U.S. Route 49 Business in Helena-West Helena, Arkansas
U.S. Route 49 Business in Jonesboro, Arkansas (decommissioned)
U.S. Route 49 Business in Paragould, Arkansas
U.S. Route 49E Business in Greenwood, Mississippi (decommissioned)
U.S. Route 49 Business in Hattiesburg, Mississippi (decommissioned)

References

External links

 Endpoints of U.S. Highway 49

 
49
49
49
Transportation in Harrison County, Mississippi
Transportation in Stone County, Mississippi
Transportation in Forrest County, Mississippi
Transportation in Covington County, Mississippi
Transportation in Simpson County, Mississippi
Transportation in Rankin County, Mississippi
Transportation in Madison County, Mississippi
Transportation in Yazoo County, Mississippi
Transportation in Tallahatchie County, Mississippi
Transportation in Coahoma County, Mississippi
Transportation in Phillips County, Arkansas
Transportation in Monroe County, Arkansas
Transportation in Woodruff County, Arkansas
Transportation in Cross County, Arkansas
Transportation in Poinsett County, Arkansas
Transportation in Craighead County, Arkansas
Transportation in Greene County, Arkansas
Transportation in Clay County, Arkansas